The trade-to-GDP ratio is an indicator of the relative importance of international trade in the economy of a country. It is calculated by dividing the aggregate value of imports and exports over a period by the gross domestic product for the same period. Although called a ratio, it is usually expressed as a percentage. It is used as a measure of the openness of a country to international trade and so may also be called the trade openness ratio. It may be seen as an indicator of the degree of globalisation of an economy.

Other factors aside, the trade-to-GDP ratio tends to be low in countries with large economies and large populations such as Japan and the United States and to have a higher value in small economies. Singapore has the highest trade-to-GDP ratio of any country; between 2008 and 2011 it averaged about 400%. 
For economies such as Armenia the trade to GDP ratio is not as high as for Singapore, but at the same time it is not as low as for the developed countries such as USA and Japan. Taking into account the last available data for Armenia, trade openness is approximately 78% for 2021. 

For trade-to-GDP ratio, the provided data for Armenia is from 1990 to 2021. The average value for Armenia during that period was 77.92% with a minimum of 54.54% in 2008 and a maximum of 112.43% in 1994.  For comparison, the world average in 2021 based on 129 countries is 90.86%. See the global rankings for that indicator or use the country comparator to compare trends over time.  

Worldwide trade-to-GDP ratio rose from just over 20% in 1995 to about 30% in 2014.

See also
List of countries by trade-to-GDP ratio

References

Macroeconomic indicators